John Weir Troy (October 31, 1868 — May 2, 1942) was an American Democratic politician who was the Governor of Alaska Territory from 1933 to 1939. He was born in Dungeness, Washington and died in Juneau, Alaska.

John Troy began his professional career in journalism, starting as a newspaper reporter in Port Townsend, Washington, shortly after graduating from high school there. He would publish newspapers in Washington and Alaska
between 1891 and 1914. He was the editor of Alaska-Yukon Magazine from 1911 to 1912.  Following this, he was the editor of the Daily Alaskan Empire for twenty years before being appointed governor in 1933.

He was the father-in-law of George A. Lingo, who was the second husband of his younger daughter, Dorothy Minerva. At the time of their marriage, Lingo was a member of the Alaska Territorial House of Representatives and the board of trustees of the Alaska Agricultural College and School of Mines.

References

External links

 

1868 births
1942 deaths
20th-century American newspaper publishers (people)
20th-century American politicians
Alaska Democrats
Burials at Evergreen Cemetery (Juneau, Alaska)
Editors of Alaska newspapers
Governors of Alaska Territory
People from Clallam County, Washington
People from Port Townsend, Washington